Kramer is a small unincorporated community in Liberty Township, Warren County, in the U.S. state of Indiana.

History 
On November 5, 1885, a post office was established called Cameron Springs, named for its first postmaster William Cameron.  On June 12, 1889, the name was changed to Indiana Mineral Springs, and on March 23, 1901 it was changed again to Kramer, for the Henry L. Kramer who built the nearby resort Hotel Mudlavia.  Mudlavia offered treatments that took advantage of the local mineral springs, which were believed to have therapeutic properties.

Indianapolis-based bottled water company Cameron Springs drew on the water's reputation to help market its product.  Perrier Group of America acquired Cameron Springs for approximately $10.5 million in June 2000.

Geography 

Demographics

References 

Unincorporated communities in Indiana
Unincorporated communities in Warren County, Indiana
Populated places established in 1885
1885 establishments in Indiana